The 2002 Regal Scottish Open was a professional ranking snooker tournament that took place between 6–14 April 2002 at the A.E.C.C in Aberdeen, Scotland. It was the eighth ranking event of the 2001/2002 season.

Stephen Lee claimed his third ranking title by defeating David Gray 9–2 in the final. This was the first all-English final of the Scottish Open and was the first all-English final of this overall competition since 1988, when Steve Davis defeated Jimmy White 12–6 in the International Open. The following year had another all-English final with David Gray defeating Mark Selby 9–7.


Main draw

Final

References

2002
Scottish Open
Open (Snooker), 2002
Sports competitions in Aberdeen